Mick Hill is an English pool player. He was WEPF men's world champion of English 8-ball pool in 2004, 2010, 2015, 2017, 2018, and 2019, the first person to win it 6 times. Frequently described as a genius by his peers, he is one of the most successful players of the sport in his generation.

Mick Hill started his pool life based from Dudley in the West Midlands. He was selected for the English Junior team for the European Championships (EPBF) held in Nurnberg, Germany, from the 4 to 11 August 1996 along with Darren Heggie (Blackburn) and Chris Melling, with Bob Love (London) as their Manager from the English Pool Association. 
The England Junior team won a commendable Bronze Medal (Double Eliminator) losing to Germany 2-1 in the Semi-Final having defeated Switzerland 2-1, losing to Finland 3-0, defeating Denmark 3-0, Belgium 3-0 and Austria 2-1.

Mick Hill was playing County pool for West Midlands before embarking upon an England Men's career, qualifying through the England Team trials in March 1998 at Attleborough Pool & Snooker Club, Norfolk.

In July 2010 Mick won his second WEPF World Eightball Championship beating the then World Number 1 Gareth Potts 11-8 in the final at the Imperial Hotel, Blackpool.

In July 2015 Mick played Nigel Clarke in the World Eightball Pool Finals. Mick won 11-5 winning his third title (2004 and 2010).

In 2017 Mick beat Tom Cousins, twice champion, in the semis. He then beat former champion Phil Harrison 11-6 in the final to be the first person to win the title four times.

In 2018 Mick beat Phil Harrison 11-8 in the final again to be the first person to win the title five times.

In 2019 Mick Hill won a 6th world title, beating Dominic Cooney in the final.

Mick played in the Dumbuck Blackball Rules Vegas Challenge at the end of 2015. Mick (the 2015 world rules champion ) met Jack Whelan (the 2015 blackball world champion) in the final. Mick won 23-20

Mick delved into Chinese 8 Ball entering the 2016 CBSA World Chinese Eight-ball Championship in Yushun, China. Mick borrowed a cue and had one week of practice before reaching the Final, only  succumbing to China's Hanqing Shi by the odd frame of an epic battle. Another British player, Darren Appleton, also reached the latter stages, losing to Shi Hanqing in the finals.

Mick plays both the main disciplines of pool (Blackball and Eightball World Rules) competitively. The Supreme Pool series, notably the Strachan Cup, pitches the best players of both IPA Blackball and Eightball together in one series of tournaments.  Mick has reached the finals in 2018 but has not won any.

References

World champions in pool
Living people
English pool players
Year of birth missing (living people)